2010 in television may refer to
 2010 in American television for television related events in the United States.
 2010 in Australian television for television related events in Australia.
 2010 in Belgian television for television related events in Belgium.
 2010 in Brazilian television for television related events in Brazil.
 2010 in British television for television related events in Great Britain.
 2010 in Scottish television for television related events in Scotland.
 2010 in Canadian television for television related events in Canada.
 2010 in Croatian television for television related events in Croatia.
 2010 in Danish television for television related events in Denmark.
 2010 in Dutch television for television related events in the Netherlands.
 2010 in Estonian television for television related events in Estonia.
 2010 in French television for television related events in France.
 2010 in German television for television related events in Germany.
 2010 in Irish television for television related events in Ireland.
 2010 in Italian television for television related events in Italy.
 2010 in Japanese television for television related events in Japan.
 2010 in New Zealand television for television related events in New Zealand.
 2010 in Norwegian television for television related events in Norway.
 2010 in Pakistani television for television related events in Pakistan.
 2010 in Philippine television for television related events in the Philippines.
 2010 in Polish television for television related events in Poland.
 2010 in Portuguese television for television related events in Portugal.
 2010 in South African television for television related events in South Africa.
 2010 in Spanish television for television related events in Spain.
 2010 in Swedish television for television related events in Sweden.

 
Mass media timelines by year